National Highway 248, commonly referred to as NH 248, is a  national highway in India. It is a spur road of National Highway 48. NH-248 traverses the state of Rajasthan in India.

References

External links 

 NH 248 on OpenStreetMap

National highways in India
National Highways in Rajasthan
National Highways in Haryana